The 14th Rajasthan Legislative Assembly was elected in 2013 Rajasthan Legislative Assembly election.

History

Election
The results were declared on 8 December 2013. Chief Minister Ashok Gehlot won from his Sardarpura constituency by a margin of 18,478 votes while Vasundhara Raje won from Jhalarpatan by 60,896 votes. The election also recorded best and worst performances for the BJP and the Congress respectively in the state. Influential Meena leader and MP from Dausa, Kirori Lal Meena received a big setback when his newly formed party, National People's Party won only four seats.

By-elections
 2014 by-elections

 2017 by-elections

 In the 2018 January by-elections Congress won Mandalgarh Assembly constituency that was previously held by BJP.

Composition

See also
 List of constituencies of Rajasthan Legislative Assembly
 Third Ashok Gehlot ministry

References

 
Rajasthan MLAs 2013–2018